Mount Brown may refer to:

Places
 Mount Brown (Alberta), Canada
 Mount Brown (Antarctica)
 Mount Brown (British Columbia), Canada
 Mount Brown (Montana), a peak in Glacier National Park, U.S.
 Mount Brown (South Australia)
Mount Brown Conservation Park, a protected area in South Australia
 Mount Brown (Papua New Guinea)
People
 Mount Brown (philatelist) (1837-1919), British philatelist

See also 
 Brown Mountain (disambiguation)
 Brown Peak (disambiguation)